VIPER: Coils of the Serpent is a role-playing supplement published by Hero Games for their Champions game, a genre of the Hero System.  The book supports the Champions Universe super hero campaign setting.

Description
VIPER is a terrorist network composed of cells called "nests."  The group provides players with a world-spanning challenge which nevertheless is often local in its specific threat.  VIPER consists mainly of lower-powered agents who have access to high-tech gear supplied by the shadowy VIPER organization.  The agents are often supported by super villains and ultimately led by a Nest Leader.  The tone of the organization is designed to be adjustable by the game master.  Depending on the needs of the campaign, they can either be campy mooks in costumes, or a ruthless conspiracy capable of crushing the characters like bugs.  As written, VIPER tends more towards the Bronze Age style.

VIPER is one of the oldest properties still published by Hero Games.  VIPER appeared in Champions at least as early as 1984.

Reviews
Pyramid

References

Campaign settings
Hero System
Role-playing game supplements introduced in 2002